Park Hyo-jun (born June 12, 1980) is a South Korean actor.

Filmography

Film
 A Wintering (short film, 2003)
 My Tutor Friend (2003)
 Once Upon a Time in High School (2004)
 Love, So Divine (2004)
 The Twins (2005)
 Princess Aurora (2005)
 My Girl and I (2005)
 The Legend of Seven Cutter (2006)
 A Dirty Carnival (2006)
 To Sir, with Love (2006)
 Bank Attack (2007)
 A Ghost's Story (2008)
 Where Are You Going? (2009)
 Camellia "Love for Sale" (2010)
 R2B: Return to Base (2012)
 Red Family (2013)
 Mr. Perfect (2014)
 The Stone (2014)
 Northern Limit Line (2015)

Television series
 Jang Gil-san (SBS, 2004)
 Biscuit Teacher and Star Candy (SBS, 2005)
 Loveholic (KBS2, 2005)
 Time Between Dog and Wolf (MBC, 2007)
 The Woman Who Still Wants to Marry (MBC, 2010)
 Golden House (tvN, 2010)
 Lie to Me (SBS, 2011)
 Vampire Prosecutor (OCN, 2011)
 Glory Jane (KBS2, 2011)
 Bachelor's Vegetable Store (Channel A, 2011)
 Man from the Equator (KBS2, 2012)
 Ji Woon-soo's Stroke of Luck (TV Chosun, 2012)
 Drama Special "The Whereabouts of Noh Sook-ja" (KBS2, 2012)
 Blue Tower (tvN, 2013) (guest appearance, episode 11)
 Stranger (SBS, 2013)
 Can We Fall in Love, Again? (jTBC, 2014)
 Inspiring Generation (KBS2, 2014)
 Big Man (KBS2, 2014)
 Bad Guys (OCN, 2014)
 The Vampire Detective (OCN, 2016) (guest appearance, episode 3)

Variety show
 Treasure Island (MBN, 2013) 
 World Challenge - Here We Go (SBS, 2013) 
 Star Face-off (SBS, 2014)

Theater
Magic Time (2007)
Hamlet
Guys and Dolls

Discography
Yes Man (duet with Baek Bong-ki) (single, 2013)

References

External links
 Park Hyo-jun Fan Cafe at Daum 
 
 
 

1980 births
Living people
South Korean male film actors
South Korean male television actors
South Korean male stage actors
21st-century South Korean male actors
South Korean YouTubers